Mississauga—Streetsville is a federal electoral district in Ontario, Canada, that has been represented in the House of Commons of Canada since 2004. This riding is centred on the villages of Streetsville and Meadowvale.

Mississauga—Streetsville is one of the most affluent ridings in Ontario, along with Mississauga—Erin Mills and Mississauga—Lakeshore.

Demographics
According to the Canada 2021 Census

Ethnic groups: 40.1% White, 25.3% South Asian, 6.4% Black, 6.3% Chinese, 5.5% Arab, 5.2% Filipino, 3.0% Latin American, 1.8% Southeast Asian 
Languages: 51.7% English, 5.1% Urdu, 3.8% Arabic, 2.6% Spanish, 2.5% Mandarin, 2.4% Tagalog, 2.2% Polish, 2.1% Punjabi, 1.8% Portuguese, 1.8% Cantonese, 1.6% Hindi, 1.3% Tamil, 1.1% French, 1.1% Italian, 1.0% Vietnamese
Religions: 53.6% Christian (32.7% Catholic, 3.5% Christian Orthodox, 2.6% Anglican, 1.9% United Church, 1.3% Pentecostal, 1.0% Presbyterian, 10.6% Other), 15.3% Muslim, 8.8% Hindu, 2.5% Sikh, 1.6% Buddhist, 17.5% No religion 
Median income: $43,600 (2020)
Average income: $57,000 (2020)

Riding history
It was created in 2003 from parts of Brampton West—Mississauga and Mississauga West ridings.

It consists of the part of the City of Mississauga bounded by a line drawn from the northwestern city limit southeast along Mississauga Road, northeast along Highway 401, southeast along Mavis Road, southwest along Britannia Road West, southeast along Terry Fox Way, southwest along Eglinton Avenue West, northwest along Erin Mills Parkway, southwest along Britannia Road West to the southwestern city limit.

This riding lost territory to Mississauga—Malton and Mississauga Centre, and gained territory from Mississauga—Brampton South and a fraction from Halton during the 2012 electoral redistribution.

Members of Parliament

This riding has elected the following Members of Parliament:

Election results

See also
 List of Canadian federal electoral districts
 Past Canadian electoral districts
 Village of Streetsville
 Village of Meadowvale

References

2011 Riding results from  Elections Canada
Riding history from the Library of Parliament
2011 Results from Elections Canada
 Campaign expense data from Elections Canada

Notes

Ontario federal electoral districts
Politics of Mississauga
2003 establishments in Ontario